Henry Addo (born 1 May 2003) is a Ghanaian professional footballer who currently plays for Žilina in the Fortuna Liga as a winger.

Club career

MŠK Žilina
Addo made his Fortuna Liga debut for Žilina at pod Čebraťom against Ružomberok on 14 February 2022. He was featured in the starting-XI and was replaced by Tibor Slebodník after 61 minutes of play with Šošoni losing 3–1. Žilina lost the game 5–1.

References

External links
 MŠK Žilina official club profile 
 
 Futbalnet profile 
 

2003 births
Living people
Ghanaian footballers
Ghanaian expatriate footballers
Association football defenders
MŠK Žilina Africa players
MŠK Žilina players
Division Two League, Ghana players
Slovak Super Liga players
Expatriate footballers in Slovakia
Ghanaian expatriate sportspeople in Slovakia